Leeds Rhinos Netball are an English netball team based in Leeds. They were founded in 2017. Together with the men's rugby league and women's rugby league teams, they are part of the Leeds Rhinos family of clubs. In 2018–19 they entered an under-19 team in England Netball's National Performance League. They joined the Netball Superleague in 2021.

History

Foundation
Leeds Rhinos Netball was founded in July 2017 in partnership with the rugby league Super League club Leeds Rhinos and their charity, the Leeds Rhinos Foundation. Anna Newell Carter was subsequently appointed director of netball and Ashton Golding became an ambassador for the team.

National Performance League
In 2018–19 Leeds Rhinos entered an under-19 team in England Netball's National Performance League, competing against the under-19 teams of Netball Superleague teams. On 15 December 2018 they made their NPL debut with a 54–53 win against Mavericks. Leeds Rhinos subsequently finished fourth in their inaugural NPL season. They secured fourth place with a 63–55 win over Surrey Storm.

Netball Superleague
In June 2019 it was announced that Leeds Rhinos would start playing in the Netball Superleague in 2021. In August 2019, as part of their preparations for joining the Superleague, Leeds Rhinos appointed Dan Ryan as head coach.

Home venues
In 2018–19, when Leeds Rhinos played in the National Performance League, they played their home matches at Leeds Beckett University. When they join the Netball Superleague they also plan to play home matches at the English Institute of Sport, Sheffield and the First Direct Arena.

Players

2023 squad

Coaches

Directors of netball

Head coaches

References

External links
  Leeds Rhinos Netball on Facebook
  Leeds Rhinos Netball on Twitter

Netball teams in England
Sport in Leeds
Netball
Netball Superleague teams
Netball in Yorkshire
Sports clubs established in 2017
2017 establishments in England